Thérèse Martin is a 1939 French biographical drama film directed by Maurice de Canonge and starring Irène Corday, Madeleine Soria and Marthe Mellot. It portrays the life of the Roman Catholic saint Thérèse of Lisieux.

The film's sets were designed by the art director Claude Bouxin.

Cast
 Irène Corday as Thérèse Martin
 Geneviève Callix as Elisabeth d'Estranges
 Madeleine Soria as 	Mme. d'Estranges
 Marthe Mellot as La supérieure
 André Marnay as 	M. André Martin
 Marthe Mancelle as Mme. Martin
 Lucien Gallas as Le docteur Dartès 
 Camille Bert as Le docteur Carnière
 Noël Roquevert as Le colonel d'Estranges
 Raymond Aimos as Joseph 
 Georges Saillard as L'abbé
 Colette Borelli as Thérèse enfant
 Pierre Feuillère as Maître Moumelon
 Yvonne Broussard as Céline Martin
 Janine Borelli as Pauline
 Solange Turenne as Pauline enfant
 Robert Moor as M. Guérin
 Geno Ferny as Firmin
 Nicholas Malikov as Pope Leo XIII

References

Bibliography 
 Rège, Philippe . Encyclopedia of French Film Directors, Volume 1. Scarecrow Press, 2009.

External links 
 

1939 films
1939 drama films
French drama  films
1930s French-language films
Films directed by Maurice de Canonge
1930s French films